Åkra Church is a parish church of the Church of Norway in Kvinnherad Municipality in Vestland county, Norway. It is located in the village of Åkra. It is the church for the Åkra parish which is part of the Sunnhordland prosti (deanery) in the Diocese of Bjørgvin. The white, wooden church was built in a long church design in 1735 using plans drawn up by an unknown architect. The church seats about 225 people.

History
The church in Åkra has been around since the Middle Ages. The earliest existing historical records of the church date back to the year 1329, but the church was not new that year. The first church was a wooden stave church that was likely built during the 13th century. In 1735, the old church was torn down and a new timber-framed long church was built on the same site. In 1787, the church was described as having its interior walls decorated in rosemåling and murals depicting angels, King David, the creation story, the Fall, as well as many characters from the Bible. The church was heavily remodeled from 1871 to 1873 and during that all of the interior artwork was removed. The nave was taken down and rebuilt, enlarging and extending it further to the west. In 1919, the parish desired to tear down the old church a build a new one, but the Norwegian Directorate for Cultural Heritage objected and after many years of back and forth, the church was renovated in 1959.

See also
List of churches in Bjørgvin

References

Kvinnherad
Churches in Vestland
Long churches in Norway
Wooden churches in Norway
18th-century Church of Norway church buildings
Churches completed in 1735
13th-century establishments in Norway